Sir Gerald David Nunes Nabarro (29 June 1913 – 18 November 1973) was a British businessman and Conservative Party politician who was an MP from 1950 until his death. Nabarro positioned himself on the right of the Conservative Party. Though he never left the backbenches, he was a comparatively high-profile political figure, owing in large part to his eccentric personal style.

Early life
Nabarro was born in Willesden Green, Middlesex, the son of an unsuccessful shopkeeper.  He was born to a prominent Sephardi Jewish family but later converted to Christianity.  Until age 14 he was educated at London County Council schools.

Career
Nabarro left school at 14, and ran away from home into the Merchant Navy. He later enlisted in the British Army's King's Royal Rifle Corps in 1930, rising to the rank of staff sergeant instructor. After some self-education he was accepted for commissioning as an officer but believed he had insufficient private means and, having served his time, he was honourably discharged in 1937. He went into the timber-supply industry, where he made his fortune, able to later claim to have served in every grade from labourer to managing director.

He also served in the Territorial Army from 1937 and at the start of the Second World War, he was commissioned as an officer in the Royal Artillery. During the war he was seconded for special industrial production processes in the United Kingdom.  He left full-time military service in favour of industrial employment in 1943 but remained on the Reserve of Officers until 1946.

Among many positions outside industry and parliament Nabarro was a Governor of the University of Birmingham and Convocation Member at Aston University; President of the Road Passenger and Transport Association 1951–55, the Merseyside area of the National Union of Manufacturers 1956–62, the London branch of the Institute of Marketing 1968–70, and the British Direct Mail Marketing Association 1968–72.

He was also interested in the revival of the Severn Valley Railway (which was partly in his former Kidderminster constituency), the basis of two of his books, Severn Valley Steam and Steam Nostalgia. In early 1972 he persuaded the SVR, of which he became chairman, to allow him to raise the money to buy the line from Hampton Loade to Foley Park by means of a share issue in a newly created public limited company. The share issue took place but after SVR volunteers discovered he planned to sell the Bridgnorth railway station site for hotel and housing development and bring business friends from outside onto the board, it led to a threatened strike by the railway's volunteer staff and his proposals were thrown out at a heated AGM.  Nabarro resigned from the board of directors in May 1973.

Political career
At the 1945 general election, Nabarro stood as the Conservative candidate in the Labour-held West Bromwich constituency. The seat was comfortably held by Labour's John Dugdale, with a swing of 18.6%, much higher than the national average of 10%.

In the general election of 1950, Nabarro was elected as Member of Parliament (MP) for Kidderminster, Worcestershire which he held until 1964. He then retired on health grounds.

Given a clean bill of health, he was selected as Conservative candidate for the safer constituency of South Worcestershire, neighbouring his old constituency, after the previous MP, Sir Peter Agnew, had retired. He duly won the seat in the 1966 general election, and represented it until he died in office in November 1973.  No by-election was held after his death; the seat was still vacant when Parliament was dissolved on 8 February 1974 for the general election later that month.

Through his career he was the sponsor of various pieces of legislation, claiming credit for The Coroner's Act (1953), the Clean Air Act 1956, Thermal Insulation (Industrial Buildings) Act (1957), Oil Burners (Standards) Act (1960), and the introduction of government health warnings on cigarette packets in 1971. He unsuccessfully proposed an amendment to the Life Peerages Bill in 1958 that would have allowed hereditary peers to renounce their peerages and seek election to sit in the House of Commons.  When Anthony Wedgwood-Benn, a Labour MP, sought to do that when forced to vacate his seat at the death of his father Viscount Stansgate in 1960, Nabarro was his chief Conservative supporter in the Commons and the two sponsored the Peerage Act of 1963, which enabled Wedgwood-Benn to re-enter the Commons, and the Earl of Home to do the same when he became Prime Minister in the same year as Sir Alec Douglas-Home. However, that renunciation was perchance when an unexpected ill-health change of Prime Minister occurred, as renouncement was only permitted within one year of inheritance of a peerage (or within one year after becoming 21 years of age if inheritance occurred before the age of 21 years), or within one year of the start of the Act, or within one month for an inheritor being a Member of the House of Commons.

Nabarro was made a Knight Bachelor for political and public services in the 1963 New Years Honours list.

Style
Nabarro characterised himself as an old-style Tory: he opposed the European Economic Community project as well as drugs, pop music and pornography and was critical of students. He was a supporter of capital punishment and backed Enoch Powell following the latter's "Rivers of Blood" speech. Even five years earlier, on 5 April 1963, while appearing on Any Questions?, he said, "How would you feel if your daughter wanted to marry a big buck nigger with the prospect of coffee-coloured grandchildren?", remarks which were excised from a repeat of the programme the following week.

Despite humble beginnings, he had the style of a conservative toff, sporting a Jimmy Edwards-style handlebar moustache, a booming baritone voice, and a Terry-Thomas accent. He enjoyed driving, and owned the personalised number plates NAB 1 to 8, which he attached to his large garage of cars including three Daimlers. He considered that a Conservative candidate's car should be substantial but not too substantial and did not own Rolls-Royces or Bentleys.

Personal life
Nabarro married, on 1 June 1943, Joan Maud Violet im Thurn, the elder daughter of Colonel Berhardt Basil von Brumsey im Thurn, DSO, of Winchester, a British Army officer of Austrian ancestry. They had two sons and two daughters. She survived him and died in 2009.

Later years
On the night of 21 May 1971, Nabarro's car NAB 1 was seen to swerve at speed the wrong way round a roundabout at Totton, Hampshire. It was occupied by Nabarro and his company secretary, Margaret Mason. The police charged him as the driver, but Nabarro insisted it was his secretary, who agreed with his story. He was found guilty by a jury at Winchester Crown Court; the judge pronounced his behaviour "outrageous" and fined him £250. He announced his appeal on the court steps immediately afterwards, accompanied by his private secretary, Christine Holman. He suffered two strokes in the following year and was cleared in the second trial.  

The Guardian newspaper speculated in 1999 that the jury had brought in their verdict to spare Nabarro the horrors of a perjury trial. In response, his son stated that the other occupant was employed as his driver and not as his secretary. He added that his father suffered from diabetes and had hardly driven for some years before the dangerous driving allegation at his doctor's orders. A few months later, having recently announced a decision to retire from the Commons on grounds of health, he died at his home, Orchard House, in Broadway, Worcestershire on 18 November 1973, aged 60. He had suffered a cerebral haemorrhage the week prior.

Publications
(Sourced from Who's Who)

Portrait of a Politician (memoir) – 1970
Severn Valley Steam – 1971
Steam Nostalgia – 1972
Learners at Large – 1973
Exploits of a Politician (memoir) – 1973

Notes

External links 
 
 Nabarro is mocked on the cover of Private Eye
 Critical article from The Guardian
 

1913 births
1973 deaths
20th-century English businesspeople
20th-century English male writers
20th-century Sephardi Jews
British Army personnel of World War II
Conservative Party (UK) MPs for English constituencies
Converts to Anglicanism from Judaism
English Anglicans
English Jewish writers
English memoirists
Jewish British politicians
King's Royal Rifle Corps soldiers
Knights Bachelor
Members of the Parliament of England for Worcestershire
People educated at Ealing County Grammar School for Boys
People from Willesden
Royal Artillery officers
UK MPs 1950–1951
UK MPs 1951–1955
UK MPs 1955–1959
UK MPs 1959–1964
UK MPs 1966–1970
UK MPs 1970–1974
English Sephardi Jews